Two ships have borne the name Iona for the US Navy, both tugboats:

  a district harbor tug captured from Spain at Cavite Navy Yard, Philippines 1898, later destroyed by the Japanese on 3 January 1942.
  a wooden tug originally classified YT-220, serving from 1944 until her accidental sinking in 1963.

United States Navy ship names